Louise McMurtrie (born 26 April 1976) is an Australian former soccer player who played as a defender for the Australia women's national soccer team. She was part of the team at the 1995 FIFA Women's World Cup. At the club level, she played for Queensland Academy of Sport in Australia. McMurtrie represented Australia 27 times between 1994 and 1996, including 19 times in full international matches.

References

External links
 

1976 births
Living people
Australian women's soccer players
Australia women's international soccer players
Place of birth missing (living people)
1995 FIFA Women's World Cup players
Women's association football defenders